Georg Scholz (15 January 1958 – 14 October 2022) was a German medical officer and politician. A member of the Social Democratic Party, he served in the Landtag of North Rhine-Westphalia from 2000 to 2005.

Scholz died on 14 October 2022, at the age of 64.

References

1958 births
2022 deaths
Members of the Landtag of North Rhine-Westphalia
Ruhr University Bochum alumni
Social Democratic Party of Germany politicians
People from Hamm